Riverside Historic District is a national historic district located at Muncie, Delaware County, Indiana. It encompasses 74 contributing buildings and 1 contributing structure in a predominantly residential section of Muncie.  The district developed between about 1895 and 1949, and includes notable examples of Colonial Revival, Tudor Revival, and Bungalow / American Craftsman style architecture.

It was added to the National Register of Historic Places in 1999.

References

Historic districts on the National Register of Historic Places in Indiana
Colonial Revival architecture in Indiana
Tudor Revival architecture in Indiana
Houses in Muncie, Indiana
Historic districts in Muncie, Indiana
National Register of Historic Places in Muncie, Indiana